Roberto Aubone (born 1 April 1939) is an Argentine former professional tennis player.

Aubone, known as "Cacho", competed in the Davis Cup for Argentina between 1960 and 1968. He featured in a total of nine ties, from which he won six singles and six doubles rubbers. In 1966, while partnering Eduardo Soriano, he had a doubles win over Mexico's Rafael Osuna and Marcelo Lara, with the match decided 14–12 in the fifth set.

See also
List of Argentina Davis Cup team representatives

References

External links
 
 
 

1939 births
Living people
Argentine male tennis players